The Canso Formation is a geologic formation in New Brunswick. It preserves fossils dating back to the Carboniferous period.

See also

 List of fossiliferous stratigraphic units in New Brunswick

References
 

Carboniferous New Brunswick
Carboniferous southern paleotropical deposits